Ban This Filth was a spoof television programme aired on Channel 4 in October 2004. The show was presented as a crusade against pornography, profanity and nudity on television. The three presenters are all elderly middle class women, who warn viewers what programmes not to watch in the coming week. It is presented in a tongue-in-cheek fashion, with segments such as:
 What not to watch, a review of programmes with nudity or pornographic scenes, the times and channels are given so viewers can avoid them
 Review of pornographic DVDs, presented, as what not to buy
 Interviews with porn stars, asking them to quit the business
 Documentary segments covering adult babies, or dogging for example

References

External links
Additional information

Channel 4 comedy
2004 British television series debuts
2004 British television series endings